The Cacowards are an annual online awards ceremony which honors the year's most prominent "Doom WADs", video game modifications of the 1993 first-person shooter Doom. Such modifications may be single levels, level packs, or "total conversions" featuring gameplay that significantly diverges from traditional Doom. Since 2004, the Cacowards have been hosted at doomworld.com, a Doom fansite.

History
In 2003, Doomworld celebrated the 10th anniversary of Doom with "10 Years of Doom", a series of articles and reviews written by Mike "Cyb" Watson and Andrew "Linguica" Stine, discussing the history and legacy of the Doom modding community across the prior decade. The event was continued in 2004 as the Cacowards, with an emphasis on discussing the year's most notable contributions to the Doom modding community. The name of the Cacowards stems from Doom's "Cacodemon" monster, whose likeness is present in the award's design.

Categories
The primary category of the Cacowards is the Top Ten, which discusses ten of the most notable Doom WADs of the year.

 Multiplayer Awards: Awarded to exemplary multiplayer-oriented WADs.
 Gameplay Mod Awards: Awarded to high-quality mods which modify or transform Doom'''s base gameplay, such as by adding or altering weapons and enemies.
 Mockaward: Awarded to the "best comedy WAD of the year"; such WADs are often designed with humorous intent, with a diminished focus on gameplay balance and longevity. The Mockaward category was discontinued in 2017.
 Mordeth Award: Awarded to the year's released project with the longest development time. The category's name references Mordeth, a total conversion mod for Doom which has been in development since 1997.
 Worst WAD: Awarded to WADs of exceptionally low quality. The Worst WAD category was discontinued in 2011, following concerns that the category rewarded users for low-effort content.

Legacy
The Cacowards have been critically praised as a resource for high-quality Doom modifications. Commenting on the event, PC Gamer stated: "If you want a direct route to the best Doom maps and mods, the place to go is the Cacowards." Rock, Paper, Shotgun shared a similar sentiment, commenting that the Cacowards are "often a handy pointer towards good and fun new things." Numerous award recipients have received additional commendations by journalists covering the Cacowards, who often review highlights from the year's ceremony.

 See also 

 Brutal Doom'' – 2011 Cacoward winner in the "Gameplay Mod Awards" category
Sigil – 2019 Cacoward runner-up
List of WADs – Examples of the most popular and historically significant WADs, many of which have won Cacowards
Cyriak (Mouldy) – Winner of 2012 and 2014 Cacowards

References

Awards established in 2004
Doom (franchise)
Video game awards